This is the results breakdown of the European Parliament election held in Spain on 26 May 2019. The following tables show detailed results in each of the country's 17 autonomous communities and in the autonomous cities of Ceuta and Melilla.

Electoral system
The 54 members of the European Parliament allocated to Spain as per the Treaty of Lisbon were elected using the D'Hondt method and a closed list proportional representation, with no electoral threshold being applied in order to be entitled to enter seat distribution. Seats were allocated to a single multi-member constituency comprising the entire national territory. Voting was on the basis of universal suffrage, which comprised all nationals and resident non-national European citizens over eighteen and in full enjoyment of their political rights. Additionally, Spaniards abroad were required to apply for voting before being permitted to vote, a system known as "begged" or expat vote. The use of the D'Hondt method might result in an effective threshold depending on the district magnitude.

The electoral law allowed for parties and federations registered in the interior ministry, coalitions and groupings of electors to present lists of candidates. Parties and federations intending to form a coalition ahead of an election were required to inform the relevant Electoral Commission within ten days of the election call. In order to be entitled to run, parties, federations, coalitions and groupings of electors needed to secure the signature of at least 15,000 registered electors; this requirement could be lifted and replaced through the signature of at least 50 elected officials—deputies, senators, MEPs or members from the legislative assemblies of autonomous communities or from local city councils. Electors and elected officials were disallowed from signing for more than one list of candidates.

Nationwide

Autonomous communities

Andalusia

Aragon

Asturias

Balearic Islands

Basque Country

Canary Islands

Cantabria

Castile and León

Castilla–La Mancha

Catalonia

Extremadura

Galicia

La Rioja

Madrid

Murcia

Navarre

Valencian Community

Autonomous cities

Ceuta

Melilla

Congress of Deputies projection
A projection of European Parliament election results using electoral rules for the Congress of Deputies would have given the following seat allocation, as distributed per constituencies and regions (note that results are compared with party totals in the preceding general election—held in April 2019—for consistency):

Constituencies

Regions

Notes

References

2019
European Parliament